Kalininsky City District is an administrative district (raion), one of the 10 raions of Novosibirsk, Russia. Population: 200,694  (2018).

History
In 1980, part of the Dzerzhinsky District became the Kalininsky District. Kalininsky raion is the newest district of the city.

In 2000, Pashino Settlement was included in the district.

In 2005, Klyukvenny Settlement became part of the Kalininsky district.

Bodies of water
The Sukhoy Log Creek flows through the district.

Microdistricts

Rodniki

Snegiri

Architecture

Soviet architecture

Post-Soviet architecture

Education
 Gymnasium 12
 Lyceum 28
 Lyceum 126
 Novosibirsk Lyceum of Nutrition

Sports
 Ice Sports Palace Sibir is the home arena of the HC Sibir Novosibirsk ice hockey team.
 Fencing sports complex with swimming pool
 Neptun Swimming Pool

Religion

Christianity

Parks

Sosnovy Bor
The park was founded in 1976. Its area is 96 hectares.

Pavlovsky Square

Economy

Industry
 Novosibirsk Mechanical Plant
 Novosibirsk Chemical Concentrates Plant
 Novosibirsk Thermal Power Station 4

Retail
The district hosts shopping centres of famous retail companies: Auchan, Leroy Merlin, Lenta.

Transportation
 Bus
 Trolleybus
 Tram

References